Slobodan Vuković (Serbian Cyrillic: Слободан Вуковић; born 23 January 1986) is a Serbian footballer who plays as a centre back for Hajduk Kula. He is an older brother of Jagoš Vuković.

Career
Born in Vrbas, he has started career in his neighbourhood club Sutjeska from Bačko Dobro Polje, there he was spotted by Serbian giants Red Star Belgrade. In year 2000, along with younger brother Jagoš he has moved to Belgrade side youth.

After youth experience in Red Star Belgrade, Slobodan was loaned to 3rd division club Sopot, there he has spent two fruitful years and earned move to Rad. After six months without a cap, he was loaned for a year to Palić, and then to Mladenovac.

After half season, he was added to second league side Voždovac, and soon his performances granted him full-time contract. After two years in Voždovac, Vuković moved abroad, to Slovakian Partizán Bardejov. After that, this centre-back went back to Serbia and spent one year in Banat, again in second league.

Having a lot of experience in lower ranks, Vuković had his debut in Serbian top level Serbian SuperLiga at the age of 27 when he became a Hajduk Kula player, six months later due to debt, a club was dissolved, and most players and Vuković among them made move to Novi Pazar.

References

External links
 Bio and Profile Slobodan Vuković at Utakmica.rs
 Profile Slobodan Vuković at Srbijafudbal.net

1986 births
Living people
Serbian footballers
Serbian expatriate footballers
Association football defenders
FK Rad players
FK Palić players
OFK Mladenovac players
FK Hajduk Kula players
FK Novi Pazar players
FK Voždovac players
Partizán Bardejov players
FK Banat Zrenjanin players
FK Radnik Surdulica players
FK Zemun players
Aittitos Spata F.C. players
Serbian SuperLiga players
Serbian First League players
People from Vrbas, Serbia
Serbian expatriate sportspeople in Greece
Expatriate footballers in Greece